The Modern Revolutionary Party ( or PRM) is a political party in the Dominican Republic. It emerged after a new division within the Dominican Revolutionary Party (PRD). It was recognized on 9 September 2014. The PRM is the legal heir of the Dominican Social Alliance.

The PRM came into power after winning the general election which was held on 5 July 2020. In addition to winning the most seats in both houses of the country's congress, PRM leader Luis Abinader was also elected President of the Dominican Republic and was successfully sworn into office on 16 August 2020.

Origin & Dominican Social Alliance party 
The Dominican Social Alliance was a minor political party of the Dominican Republic. It was founded by Rafael Abinader. In the 16 May 2006 election, the party was member of the defeated Grand National Alliance. In 2014 it was transformed into a new party, the Modern Revolutionary Party, when most senior leaders of the Dominican Revolutionary Party (widely known as los viejos robles, the ) followed Luis Abinader and Hipólito Mejía to found a new party.

By 4 August 2014, 34 deputies had confirmed their move from the PRD to the PRM. The PRM participated for the first time in the general elections of 2016, where it led a coalition made up of more than 10 parties.

References 

Political parties in the Dominican Republic
Political parties established in 2014
Social democratic parties
Social liberal parties

Progressive Alliance
2014 establishments in the Dominican Republic